Lumsden is an inland village in Aberdeenshire, Scotland on the A97 road.

Location

History
The village was founded around 1825 by Harry Leith Lumsden of Auchindoir on what was then a barren moor.

Population
The population was 243 in 1840, 478 in 1861, 487 in 1871 and 519 in 1881. The  population in 2009 is 344, a decline to levels before 1861.

Transport 
The village is served once a day on weekdays by the 231 service between Alford and Huntly.

Notable people
 William Robertson Nicoll, writer and Free Church minister, born in Lumsden.

References

External links

Lumsden in the Gazetteer for Scotland.

Villages in Aberdeenshire